In the Earth's atmosphere, water vapor absorbs many wavelengths of Infrared (IR) energy, while others are not absorbed. The remaining sections of the Electromagnetic spectrum that the water vapor does not absorb are like an opening in the atmosphere, allowing electromagnetic energy to flow freely in and out of the system, much like a window that allows light to enter and leave. Originally discovered by John Tyndall, most of the infrared coming from the Universe is blocked, and absorbed by water vapor (and other greenhouse gases) in the Earth's atmosphere. These wavelength ranges that can partially reach the surface are coming through what is called 'water vapor windows'. These windows are how astronomers can view the Universe with IR telescopes, called Infrared astronomy. The net incoming solar shortwave radiation and the net outgoing terrestrial longwave radiation at the top of the atmosphere keep the Earth's energy balance in check. The global averaged value of emitted, longwave radiation is 238.5 Wm2, according Loeb et al. (2009)'s study of satellite observation. One may get the effective emission temperature of the globe by assuming that the Earth-atmosphere system radiates as a blackbody in accordance with the Stefan-Boltzmann equation of blackbody radiation. The resultant temperature is -18.7 °C. Compared to +14.5 °C, the average worldwide temperature of the Earth's surface, it is 33 °C cooler. This suggests that the Earth's surface is up to 33 °C warmer than it would be without the atmosphere. These windows also allow orbiting satellites to measure the IR energy leaving the planet, the SSTs, and other important matters.  See Electromagnetic absorption by water: Atmospheric effects.

See also 
 Greenhouse gas

References

Atmospheric radiation
Satellite meteorology
Electromagnetic spectrum
Climatology
Climate change
Atmosphere

5. Manabe, Syukuro. “Role of Greenhouse Gas in Climate Change.” Tellus A: Dynamic Meteorology and Oceanography, vol. 71, no. 1, Stockholm UP, Jan. 2019, p. 1620078.